Diablo fuerte is a 1925 Chilean silent film directed by Carlos F. Borcosque. It stars boxer Luis Vicentini.

References

External links
 

1925 films
Chilean silent films
Films directed by Carlos F. Borcosque
Chilean black-and-white films